Intel Corp. v. Advanced Micro Devices, Inc., 542 U.S. 241 (2004), is a decision by the Supreme Court of the United States involving , which authorizes United States district courts to enforce discovery requests made in connection with litigation being conducted in foreign tribunals.  Prior to Intel, there had been substantial disagreement as to the availability of Section 1782 discovery.

The Intel case originated from Advanced Micro Devices' antitrust claims against Intel in Europe. AMD filed a complaint against Intel in the European Union's antitrust enforcement agency (the Directorate-General for Competition), and then filed a lawsuit in the U.S. for discovery of certain Intel documents in order to further their complaint.

See also
List of United States Supreme Court cases, volume 542
List of United States Supreme Court cases

External links

PDFs 
Intel's petition on the merits
AMD's Response brief on the merits
Intel's reply brief
The Solicitor General's Amicus brief
The oral arguments before the Supreme Court

Other links 
 Obtaining Evidence in the United States

United States Supreme Court cases
United States discovery case law
2004 in United States case law
Intel litigation
AMD
United States Supreme Court cases of the Rehnquist Court